Post-Kemalism, especially in Turkish academia and political debate, is a movement that argues that the source of Turkey's political and cultural problems, especially democratization, lies in the military-bureaucratic Unionist and Kemalist ideology, and its basis is questioning Turkish official historiography. The post-Kemalist movement, which emerged after coup of 1980, became the center of Turkish historiography with the coming to power of the Justice and Development Party in the 2000s, and started to decline after the 2010s.

Views of Post-Kemalists 
Post-Kemalists are generally not affiliated with a certain political ideology. Authors supporting various ideologies like socialism, liberalism and conservatism have been described as post-Kemalists. However, this movement, which has a postmodern understanding of history in general, looks at Turkish historiography and the establishment of the Turkish state from a critical perspective. The centre-periphery model, which Şerif Mardin adapted to the conditions of Turkey, lies on the basis of post-Kemalist thought. According to Mardin, the 'centre' made up of the military-bureaucrat class excluded the 'periphery' made up of liberals, socialists, minorities, especially Kurds and traditionalists, and pushed them out of the main stage of Turkish politics. The political 'centre' came into conflict with the 'periphery' in order to maintain its power and realize its modernization mission, and saw them as a threat to itself and tried to suppress this movement. This was seen as the main reason for the military interventions and party closures in Turkey.

In addition, post-Kemalists drew attention to the 'top down' character of the reforms made in the Atatürk period. Various authors have criticized the formalist structure of the reforms and their inability to spread to the society, and have criticized these reforms as the product of an oppressive modernization.

History 
Although the term post-Kemalist was used in various meanings by some historians before the 1980s, it was defined by İlker Aytürk in 2015. After the coup of 1980, researchers such as Şerif Mardin, Mete Tunçay and Erik Jan Zürcher began to question Kemalism and Unionism by going beyond the official understanding of history. As a result of this critical outlook, many academics were excluded from various positions in the 1980s and 90s. After the 1997 memorandum, post-Kemalist criticism increased. A turning point in terms of post-Kemalism was the coming to power of the Justice and Development Party in 2002. The fall of the 'military-bureaucratic' order together with the AK Party government has made post-Kemalism the center of Turkish historiography. Events such as the European Union harmonization laws that were put into effect, erasing the traces of the 12 September and 28 February periods, the 2007 constitutional amendments, the Ergenekon and Sledgehammer cases and the Resolution Process were described as putting the post-Kemalist understanding into practice. However, as the AKP government became increasingly authoritarian after 2008, civilian constitutional proposals were not fully implemented, supression of Gezi Park protests and the failure of Peace Process, the view towards the AK Party changed in Turkish intellectual circles. Some post-Kemalist writers close to the AK Party government have severed their ties with the AK Party and Recep Tayyip Erdoğan. After these events, Turkish historiography started to move away from post-Kemalism.

References 

Kemalism
Political movements in Turkey